Jimo or JIMO may refer to:

 Jimo District, Qingdao, Shandong, China
 Joint Institute for Marine Observations
 Journal of Industrial and Management Optimization, an international journal 
 Jupiter Icy Moons Orbiter, a formerly proposed NASA probe to Jupiter and Europa
 Journal of the International Meteor Organization